Peter Roger Hunt (11 March 1925 – 14 August 2002) was a British director, editor and producer of film and television, best known for his work on the James Bond film series, first as an editor and then as a second unit director. He finally served as director for On Her Majesty's Secret Service. His work on the series helped pioneer an innovative, fast-cutting editing style.

Biography 
As an infantryman, Hunt served in Salerno, Italy, in 1943.

After working in several forms of employment, Hunt worked as an assistant cutter for Alexander Korda, before working as an assembling editor on The Man Who Watched Trains Go By. After several B-movies, he served as the supervising editor on A Hill in Korea. The following year, Hunt edited The Admirable Crichton (directed and co-written by Lewis Gilbert), becoming good friends with John Glen. Hunt continued his collaboration with Gilbert on films such as Ferry to Hong Kong and Sink the Bismarck!.

In the 1960s, Hunt signed on as an editor on the first James Bond film, Dr. No (1962), and he edited From Russia with Love (1963) and Goldfinger (1964). On those three films, Hunt developed an editing technique in which he utilized quick cutting, allowing camera swings during action and inserts interleaving other elements. He also worked with Harry Saltzman and Albert R. Broccoli on the Bob Hope film Call Me Bwana (1963), and with Saltzman and a few other Bond veterans on the non-Eon thriller The IPCRESS File (1965). Call Me Bwana was the only film produced by the James Bond production company Eon Productions that was not a Bond film until 2014.

After editing Thunderball (1965), Hunt asked to direct You Only Live Twice (1967) but was passed over in favor of Lewis Gilbert. Although Hunt initially quit in protest, Broccoli and Saltzman persuaded him to stay as second unit director on the understanding that he would be promoted to director in a future Eon film. Saltzman and Broccoli were impressed with his quick cutting skills and felt he had set the style for the series. Hunt directed the "Little Nellie" sequence of the film. When Gilbert passed on the opportunity to direct On Her Majesty's Secret Service (1969), Broccoli and Saltzman selected Hunt as director. Hunt also asked for the position during the production of Chitty Chitty Bang Bang (1968), and he brought along with him many crew members, including cinematographer Michael Reed and editor John Glen. Hunt was concerned to put his mark on the production – "I wanted it to be different than any other Bond film would be. It was my film, not anyone else's."

On Her Majesty's Secret Service was the last James Bond film on which Hunt worked. Hunt was asked to direct numerous other Eon Bond films — including Live and Let Die, The Spy Who Loved Me, and For Your Eyes Only — but always declined. In 1971, Hunt directed episodes of The Persuaders! with Bond star, Roger Moore; he also directed Moore in Gold (1974) and Shout at the Devil (1976) with Lee Marvin. Although approached by Kevin McClory, he refused to direct Never Say Never Again (1983) afraid that Broccoli would consider him disloyal. His last films included Wild Geese II (1985) and the Cannon Film thrillers, Death Hunt (1981) and Assassination (1987), both starring Charles Bronson. He also directed the epic television miniseries The Last Days of Pompeii (1984).

Personal life 
In his final years, Hunt lived in the United States. He died of heart failure on 14 August 2002 at his home in Santa Monica, California, at the age of 77.

Filmography

Film

Television

References
  Content in this article was copied from Peter R. Hunt at the James Bond wiki, which is licensed under the Creative Commons Attribution-Share Alike 3.0 (Unported) (CC-BY-SA 3.0) license.

External links
 
 Peter Hunt interview

1925 births
2002 deaths
Action film directors
British Army personnel of World War II
English expatriates in the United States
English film editors
English television directors
English television producers
Film directors from London